Ronny Philomena Bayer (born February 17, 1966) is a former Belgian professional basketball player. At a height of 1.86 m (6'1 ") tall, he played at the point guard position. He was born in Antwerp, Belgium.

Professional career
Bayer spent the major part of his club career playing with Oostende. He was the Belgian Player of the Year in 1990, a FIBA European Selection team member in 1995, and a FIBA EuroStar, in 1996.

Belgian national team
Bayer was a regular member of the senior Belgian national basketball team. With Belgium, he played at the 1993 EuroBasket.

References

External links 
FIBA Profile
FIBA Europe Profile

1966 births
Living people
BBC Aalstar players
Belfius Mons-Hainaut players
BC Oostende players
Belgian men's basketball players
Point guards
Sportspeople from Antwerp